Gokhivare is a census town in Vasai-Virar taluka of Palghar district in the Indian state of Maharashtra. Until recently when Palghar district was formed on 1 August 2014, Gokhivare came under the original Thane district. Gokhivare is governed by Vasai-Virar Municipal Corporation.

Demographics
 India census, Gokhivare had a population of 19,772. Males constitute 57% of the population and females 43%. Gokhivare has an average literacy rate of 64%, higher than the national average of 59.5%: male literacy is 73%, and female literacy is 53%. In Gokhivare, 17% of the population is under 6 years of age.

References

Cities and towns in Palghar district
Vasai-Virar